Hamidreza Zohani is an Iranian footballer.

Club career
Played for Payam Mashhad F.C., Saba Battery F.C. and Saipa F.C. He was recovering from an injury during the 2009/10 season. For 2010/11 he joined F.C. Aboomoslem.

International career
He featured for the Iran national team 2005 Islamic Solidarity Games.

References

External links
Persian League Profile

Iran international footballers
Iranian footballers
Saipa F.C. players
Saba players
Payam Mashhad players
F.C. Aboomoslem players
Iranjavan players
Living people
1980 births
Association football forwards